The London dock strike was an industrial dispute involving dock workers in the Port of London. It broke out on 14 August 1889, and resulted in victory for the 100,000 strikers and established strong trade unions amongst London dockers, one of which became the nationally important Dock, Wharf, Riverside and General Labourers' Union. The strike is widely considered a milestone in the development of the British labour movement, symbolising the growth of the New Unions of casual, unskilled and poorly paid workers, in contrast to the craft unions already in existence. The strike helped to draw attention to the problem of poverty in Victorian Britain and the dockers' cause attracted considerable public sympathy.

Background
Colonel G. R. Birt, the general manager at the Millwall Docks, gave evidence to a Parliamentary committee, on the physical condition of the workers:
The poor fellows are miserably clad, scarcely with a boot on their foot, in a most miserable state ... These are men who come to work in our docks who come on without having a bit of food in their stomachs, perhaps since the previous day; they have worked for an hour and have earned 5d.; their hunger will not allow them to continue: they take the 5d. in order that they may get food, perhaps the first food they have had for twenty-four hours.

Prior to the strike, few dockers were organised, but once it began, the Dock, Wharf, Riverside and General Labourers' Union recruited a substantial section of the London docks workforce. The principal demand of the agitation was for the dockers' tanner, meaning a rate of sixpence an hour. The strike was noted for large, peaceful processions which impressed middle class opinion and won sympathy for the strikers' cause from figures such as Cardinal Manning, who acted as meditator between the striking workers and the dock owners. He was seen as fair and impartial by both sides. Upon the resolution of the strike, the dock workers collected £160 for Manning in appreciation of his work, and Manning donated the money to a local hospital to provide a bed.

Notable organisers who came to prominence during the strike include Ben Tillett, John Burns, Tom Mann, Ben Cooper, Will Thorne and the seamen's leader Joseph Havelock Wilson. The most notable politician to come to the fore during the strike was the Progressive Party London County Councillor John Benn. As an increasingly prominent local politician, he was invited to stand for Parliament as the Liberal Party candidate for St George Division of Tower Hamlets. He was subsequently elected in the 1892 general election, becoming the first of four generations of the Benn family to serve as MPs.

The London Dock Strike was preceded by several other developments which marked the emergence of a new mood amongst the unskilled. The strike of match-girls at the Bryant and May match strike, and the successful organisation of London gasworkers by Will Thorne were amongst these omens. The dockers' strike was more dramatic than these disputes however, because of the sheer number of workers involved, the poor reputation that dockers previously enjoyed, and various other aspects of the dispute.

Dispute
The dock strike began over a dispute about 'plus' money during the unloading of the Lady Armstrong in the West India Docks. 'Plus' money was a bonus paid for completing work quickly. The East and West India Docks Company's (E&WIDC), general manager Lieutenant Colonel John Lowther du Plat Taylor (of 49th Middlesex Rifle Volunteers) had cut their 'plus' rates to attract ships into their own docks rather than others.

Evaluations
From the Catholic Church's point of view, Cardinal Manning's involvement in the strike, as a mediator trusted by both sides, could be seen as foreshadowing the encyclical Rerum novarum ('Of New Things') issued by Pope Leo XIII two years later, on 15 May 1891. Addressing "the condition of the working classes", the Church's policy set out in that encyclical explicitly supported the right of labour to form unions, but rejected socialism and affirmed private property rights. ("Each needs the other: capital cannot do without labour, nor labour without capital. Mutual agreement results in the beauty of good order, while perpetual conflict necessarily produces confusion and savage barbarity".)

Robert Speaight, a biographer of Hilaire Belloc, noted that Cardinal Manning's involvement in the Dock Strike made a major impression on Belloc, 19 years old at the time, who was to become a major speaker for the Catholic Church during the early 20th century. As retrospectively told by Belloc himself in The Cruise of the Nona (1925), the example of Cardinal Manning influenced him to become a trenchant critic both of unbridled capitalism and of many aspects of socialism.

See also

Stepney Historical Trust

References

Sources
 Duffy, A. E. P. "New Unionism in Britain, 1889-1890: A Reappraisal," Economic History Review (1961) 14#2 pp 306–319.
 Lovell, John. Stevedores and dockers: a study of trade unionism in the Port of London, 1870-1914 (1969)
 Oram, R. B. "The Great Strike of 1889." History Today (Aug 1964_ 14#8 pp 532–541.
Ben Tillett Memories and Reflections (London, 1931)

External links

 The Great Dock Strike at the PortCities project
 Top of the docks How social hierarchy determined the outcome of the 1889 London dock strike
 Trade Union Ancestors
 

1889 labor disputes and strikes
1889 in England
History of Catholicism in England
Labour disputes in England
Labour disputes in the United Kingdom
Poverty in England
Water transport in England
1889 in London
Social history of London
Economic history of London
Port of London
Maritime strikes
August 1889 events